Transtillaspis stiphra is a species of moth of the family Tortricidae. It is found in Peru.

The wingspan is 21 mm. The ground colour of the forewings is white, in the distal area of the wing with glossy marks. The hindwings are whitish, tinged with pale brownish on the peripheries and sprinkled blackish costally.

Etymology
The species name refers to the sclerites of the genitalia and is derived from Greek stiphros (meaning strong).

References

Moths described in 2013
Transtillaspis
Taxa named by Józef Razowski